Caspia is a genus of marine snails, brackish water snails and freshwater snails with a gill and an operculum, an aquatic gastropod mollusk in the family Hydrobiidae. Caspia is the type genus of the Caspiidae, that is a synonym of Pyrgulinae.

Species
Species within the genus Caspia include:
 Caspia baerii Clessin & W. Dybowski in W. Dybowski, 1888 - type species, marine
Caspia brotzkajae Starobogatov in Anistratenko & Prisjazhnjuk, 1992 - marine
Caspia gaillardi (Tadjalli-Pour, 1977) - marine
Caspia gmelinii Clessin & W. Dybowski in W. Dybowski, 1888 - marine
Caspia knipowitchi Makarov, 1938 - marine and brackish
Caspia logvinenkoi (Golikov & Starobogatov, 1966) - freshwater
Caspia makarovi (Golikov & Starobogatov, 1966) - freshwater and brackish
Caspia pallasii Clessin & W. Dybowski, 1887
Caspia stanislavi Alexenko & Starobogatov, 1987 - freshwater and brackish
Caspia valkanovi (Golikov & Starobogatov, 1966)
Species brought into synonymy
Caspia issykkulensis Clessin, 1894: synonym of Pseudocaspia issykkulensis (Clessin, 1894)

References

Hydrobiidae